Ion Ţiriac and Guillermo Vilas were the defending champions but did not compete that year.

Jimmy Connors and Brian Gottfried won in the final 7–6, 6–2 against Kevin Curren and Steve Denton.

Seeds
Champion seeds are indicated in bold text while text in italics indicates the round in which those seeds were eliminated.

Draw

Final

Top half

Bottom half

External links
 1980 Volvo International Doubles draw

Doubles